The 3 Way is a 1999 album by the American indie rock band, Lilys.

The album continued Lilys leader Kurt Heasley's 1960s rock influence, with Pitchfork Media's Michael Sandlin stating "Heasley's ransacking encompasses almost the entire stylistic sprawl of the '60s on the groove- a- minute shindig that is The 3-Way," with the influence of The Kinks strongly in evidence.

Track listing 
 "Dimes Make Dollars" – 2:24
 "Socs Hip" – 7:12
 "Accepting Applications at University" – 2:51
 "And One (on One)" – 4:06
 "Leo Ryan (Our Pharoah's Slave)" – 7:17
 "Solar Is Here" – 1:42
 "The Spirits Merchant" – 4:27
 "The Lost Victory" – 1:42
 "The Generator" – 2:16
 "A Tab for the Holiday" – 2:15

Personnel 
Kurt Heasley, Michael Deming, Torben Pastore, Aaron Sperske, and David Shuman

References 

1999 albums
Lilys albums